Miss Vietnam 2016 (Vietnamese: Hoa hậu Việt Nam 2016) was the 15th edition of the Miss Vietnam pageant. It was held on  August 28, 2016 at Phu Tho Indoor Stadium, Ho Chi Minh City, Vietnam. Miss Vietnam 2014 Nguyễn Cao Kỳ Duyên crowned her successor Đỗ Mỹ Linh at the end of the event.

Results

Placements
Color keys

§ Winner Beauty with a Purpose Vietnam

Special Awards

Contestants
36 contestants in the final.

References

Beauty pageants in Vietnam
2016 beauty pageants
Vietnamese awards